Schellsburg Historic District is a national historic district located at Schellsburg, Bedford County, Pennsylvania.  The district includes 92 contributing buildings in the crossroads community of Schellsburg. The buildings date between about 1810 and 1949, and include notable examples of Prairie School and Federal style architecture. There are 73 residences, three historic churches, one former school, 15 commercial buildings, three mixed use buildings, and 15 barns.

It was added to the National Register of Historic Places in 2001.

References

Federal architecture in Pennsylvania
Prairie School architecture in Pennsylvania
Historic districts in Bedford County, Pennsylvania
Historic districts on the National Register of Historic Places in Pennsylvania
National Register of Historic Places in Bedford County, Pennsylvania